Phoebe Litchfield (born 18 April 2003) is an Australian cricketer who plays as a left-handed batter and occasional right-arm leg break bowler. She plays for the New South Wales Breakers in the Women's National Cricket League (WNCL) and the Sydney Thunder in the Women's Big Bash League (WBBL). She made her WBBL debut on 18 October 2019, aged 16, and scored 26 runs off 22 balls. In her second match for the Thunder, she became the youngest player to make a half century in the WBBL. Litchfield was raised in Orange, New South Wales and attended Kinross Wolaroi School.

In January 2022, Litchfield was named in Australia's A squad for their series against England A, with the matches being played alongside the Women's Ashes.

International Career
In December 2022, Litchfield was named in the Australian ODI squad for a series of one-day matches against Pakistan. She made her ODI debut in the same series on the 16 January 2023, opening the batting and making 78* (not out) to chase down the total.

References

Further reading

External links

Phoebe Litchfield at Cricket Australia

2003 births
Living people
People from Orange, New South Wales
Australia women Twenty20 International cricketers
Australian women cricketers
New South Wales Breakers cricketers
Sydney Thunder (WBBL) cricketers
Cricketers from New South Wales